The men's 110 metres hurdles event at the 1994 Commonwealth Games was held on 22 and 23 August at the Centennial Stadium in Victoria, British Columbia.

Medalists

Results

Heats
Wind:Heat 1: +1.4 m/s, Heat 2: +1.8 m/s

Final
Wind: +1.6 m/s

References

110
1994